Liu Chao-han (born 3 January 1939) is a radio engineer/scientist and an international leader in solar terrestrial physics and remote sensing research.  He served as Vice President of the Academia Sinica from 2006 to 2011 after serving as President of National Central University for 12 years and as Chancellor of the University System of Taiwan for 4 years. He is a Fellow of the Institute of Electrical and Electronics Engineers, an Academician of the Academia Sinica and a member of the National Academy of Engineering.

Early life
Liu was born in Liuzhou, Guangxi, China on January 3, 1939, to Liu Guoyun, a general in the Republic of China Armed Forces, and Zhong Wanfang. He has five brothers, Liu Chao-Ning, Liu Chao-Hua, Liu Chao-Li, Liu Chao-shiuan, and Liu Chao-Kai.

Liu earned a BsC from National Taiwan University in 1960.  He went on to receive his PhD from Brown University in 1965.

Career 
He started his academic career at the University of Illinois at Urbana-Champaign in 1965 where he taught Electrical Engineering for 25 years.  He was promoted to full professor in 1974 and became professor emeritus in 1993.  From 1981 to 1999, he played leadership roles in the Scientific Committee on Solar Terrestrial Physics (SCOSTEP) of the International Council of Scientific Unions (ICSU), first as Scientific Secretary, and later as the President.

He is one of the founding leaders of Taiwan's Space Program.  Shortly after returning to Taiwan in 1990 and based on his earlier research, he proposed and guided the implementation of the Constellation Observation System for Meteorology Ionosphere & Climate, FORMOSAT III/COSMIC, in collaboration with University Corporation for Atmospheric Research (UCAR) and the Jet Propulsion Laboratory (JPL) in the United States.  From 2006-2020, the data collected by this system enabled the drastic improvement in the daily weather forecast.  Almost all major weather centers around the world were using the data from FORMOSAT-III/COSMIC for their forecasting operations.

In related work, Liu, in the 1980's together with his students, innovated a versatile and inexpensive technology known as "Computerized Ionosphere Tomography (CIT)" which was adopted for the remote sensing of the structure and dynamics of the ionospheres worldwide.  Liu also established a VHF Radar system at National Central University to investigate the atmospheric waves and turbulence.

Since the mid-1990's, he led a group of scientists with different disciplinary backgrounds to carry out global change and sustainability research in Taiwan and Southeast Asia, establishing Taiwan as a regional leader in this field internationally.

During his Presidency at the National Central University (1990-2002), he helped transform the University to become one of the top research universities in Taiwan.  In 2003, he became the founding Chancellor of the University System of Taiwan which has become a new model of collaboration among universities in the country.

Recognition 
Liu is an Academican of the Academia Sinica (1998); an elected Member of the Academy of Sciences for the Developing World (TWAS); and an International Member of the National Academy of Engineering (2012).

He was awarded the Special Achievement Award from IEEE-APS (1968); elected a Fellow of the Institue of Electrical and Electronics Engineers (1981); the Brown Engineering Award Medal (1997); the Distinguished Alumni Award of National Taiwan University (2008) and the Horace Mann Medal (2011-2012).

In 2019, National Central University named the No. 207603 asteroid discovered by the Lulin Observatory as "Liuchaohan" in his honor.

Personal life
Liu married Mong Tsuei Chu. They have a daughter, Alice C.Y. Liu, and a son, Robert C.B. Liu.

References

1939 births
Living people
People from Hengyang
Presidents of National Central University
Members of Academia Sinica
Academic staff of the National Taiwan University
University of Illinois Urbana-Champaign faculty
Academic staff of the National Central University
National Taiwan University alumni
Brown University School of Engineering alumni
Fellow Members of the IEEE
Foreign associates of the National Academy of Engineering
Taiwanese people from Hunan
TWAS fellows
Scientists from Hunan